Pallant may refer to:

 Cheryl Pallant, a poet, author, dancer, performance artist, and professor who lives in Richmond, Virginia
 Master of the Pallant Altarpiece, a German painter, active in Cologne around 1430
 Pallant House Gallery, an art gallery in Chichester, West Sussex, England